Daoukro is a town in east-central Ivory Coast. It is a sub-prefecture of and the seat of Daoukro Department. It is also the seat of Iffou Region in Lacs District. Daoukro is also a commune.

Administration 
A law of 1978 established 27 full-service municipalities in the territory of the country.

Demographics

Education

Languages 

Since independence, the official language throughout Ivory Coast has been French. The lingua franca, spoken and understood by the majority of the population, is Dioula, but the vernacular of the region is Baoulé. The French actually spoken in the region, as in Abidjan, is commonly called Ivorian Popular French or Moussa’s French that is distinct from standard French pronunciation and also uses specific words, which makes it almost unintelligible to non-Ivorians.

Another form of spoken French is Nouchi, a slang spoken mainly by young people and which is also the language in which two satirical magazines are written, Gbich! and Y Fohi.

Since Daoukro Department receives many Ivorians from all over the country, all the vernacular languages of the country (about sixty) are practiced.

Sports 
The city has two football clubs, the RFC Daoukro, finalist of the Cup of Cote d'Ivoire football in 2002, and AS Daoukro, which competes in the Division Regional Championship, the equivalent of a fourth-tier division Both teams play their home games at Daoukro Municipal Stadium. As in most cities, it is organized, informally, tournament football players to seven, very popular in Ivory Coast, are called Maracanas. In 2008, Daoukro was a city-stage of the Tour of White Gold: the stage was won by the Ivorian rider Balima Mahamadi.

Figures linked to the town 

 Henri Konan Bédié (politician, President of the Republic of 1995 to 1999, chairman of PDCI-RDA)
 Gnamien N'goran (politician,  1995-1999)
 Henriette Lagou, Minister of Social Action
 Lamine Konaté, representing RDR

Villages
The 18 villages of the sub-prefecture of Daoukro and their population in 2014 are.

Notes 

Sub-prefectures of Iffou
Communes of Iffou
Regional capitals of Ivory Coast